Loxophlebia diaphana is a moth of the subfamily Arctiinae. It was described by Sepp in 1848. It is found in the Amazon region.

The larvae have been recorded feeding on Serjania paullinia.

See also
Sepp publishing family

References

Loxophlebia
Moths described in 1848